Martin Deanov (also Martin Deyanov or Мартин Деянов – born 17 January 1980 in Burgas) is a Bulgarian professional footballer retired from football in 2016.
Deanov has spent most of his career in the Malta playing for Pieta Hotspurs, Marsaxlokk, Balzan, Birzebbuga St. Peters, Hamrun Spartans and Gharghur F.C., but also had spells in the Bulgarian Premier with F.C. Hebar Pazardzhik, F.C. Belasitsa Petrich and also in the U21 Bulgarian national team.

Honours
 2005–06 Maltese Premier Division second place Best Foreigner (Pieta Hotspurs)
 2008–09 Maltese First Division second place Best Player (Pieta Hotspurs)
 2009–10 Maltese First Division Champions (Marsaxlokk)
 2009–10 Maltese First Division Best Player (Marsaxlokk)

References

External links
 Martin Deanov at MaltaFootball.com
 

1980 births
Living people
Bulgarian footballers
Association football forwards
Pietà Hotspurs F.C. players
FC Hebar Pazardzhik players
PFC Belasitsa Petrich players
Marsaxlokk F.C. players
Balzan F.C. players
Expatriate footballers in Malta
First Professional Football League (Bulgaria) players
Second Professional Football League (Bulgaria) players
Sportspeople from Burgas